The 1979 Harvard Crimson football team was an American football team that represented Harvard University during the 1979 NCAA Division I-A football season. Harvard finished sixth in the Ivy League.

In their ninth year under head coach Joe Restic, the Crimson compiled a 3–6 record and were outscored 157 to 148. Michael G. Brown was the team captain.

Harvard's 3–4 conference record placed sixth in the Ivy League standings. The Crimson outscored Ivy opponents 131 to 123. 

Harvard played its home games at Harvard Stadium in the Allston neighborhood of Boston, Massachusetts.

Schedule

References

Harvard
Harvard Crimson football seasons
Harvard Crimson football
Harvard Crimson football